Leicester West Bridge is a former railway station in Leicester, Leicestershire. It was the terminus of the Leicester and Swannington Railway until 1928.

Being one of the earliest public railways, and intended for the transport of coal, the idea of carrying passengers had not occurred to the line's promoters. Thus facilities for buying tickets were provided at local inns or from the keepers of various road crossings. Such was the case at West Bridge until 1893 when, belatedly, the Midland Railway built a new passenger station around 150 yards away, nearer to the houses on the (then new) Tudor Road.

Passenger trains on the stub to Leicester West Bridge ended in September 1928, although coal and oil traffic continued until 29 April 1966 after which the track was removed and the station buildings demolished. The original 1832 station is thought to have been the third oldest station in the world; its site is now Richard III Road. Slightly to the west, the platform of the 1893 station is, extant. Further north the site of the engine shed and the sidings at Soar Lane New Wharf are now a public park, the Rally.

References

Transport in Leicester
Disused railway stations in Leicestershire
Railway stations in Great Britain opened in 1832
Railway stations in Great Britain closed in 1928
Former Midland Railway stations